The Shubert Theatre is a 1,600-seat theatre located at 247 College Street in New Haven, Connecticut. Originally opened in 1914 by The Shubert Organization, it was designed by Albert Swazey, a New York architect and built by the H.E. Murdock Construction Company. It is currently operated as a non-profit organization by CAPA (The Connecticut Association for the Performing Arts) under the aegis of the Columbus Association for the Performing Arts.

The theater struggled financially in the 1970's and closed in 1976. The theater building was subsequently acquired by the City of New Haven, and the interior was restored. The Adams Hotel, which was located between the historic theater building and College Street, was demolished to build a modern lobby addition. The theatre reopened under city ownership in 1983, operated by CAPA.

Notable productions
Like many theaters outside New York City, the Shubert has been used as a tryout venue. It has hosted a reported 600-plus out of town tryouts, including more than 300 world premieres and more than 50 American premieres.

Pre-Broadway engagements at the Shubert:
 1916: Robinson Crusoe, Jr.
 1921: Dulcy
 1922: Seventh Heaven
 1923: Stepping Stones
 1925: The Vagabond King
 1926: The Desert Song
 1927: A Connecticut Yankee
 1928: Street Scene
 1930: Strike Up the Band
 1931: The Barretts of Wimpole Street, The Wonder Bar, The Third Little Show, Of Thee I Sing
 1932: Gay Divorce
 1934: All the King's Horses, The Children's Hour
 1935: Dead End
 1936: Stage Door, Red, Hot and Blue
 1937: Room Service
 1938: I Married an Angel, Leave It to Me!, The Boys From Syracuse
 1939: Stars in Your Eyes, Too Many Girls, Du Barry Was a Lady
 1940: Louisiana Purchase, Panama Hattie
 1941: Blithe Spirit, Best Foot Forward, Sunny River
 1943: Oklahoma! (then titled Away We Go)
 1944: The Cherry Orchard, Follow the Girls
 1945: Carousel, Marinka, The Secret Room, The Girl From Nantucket, The Day Before Spring, Billion Dollar Baby, Lute Song
 1946: St. Louis Woman, Annie Get Your Gun, Shootin' Star, Windy City, Around the World, Sweet Bye and Bye, Come On Up
 1947: Barefoot Boy With Cheek, Allegro, A Streetcar Named Desire
 1948: My Romance, Sleepy Hollow, Love Life, As the Girls Go, Along Fifth Avenue
 1949: South Pacific, Regina
 1950: Texas, Li'l Darlin''', Great to Be Alive, Call Me Madam, Bless You All 1951: The King and I, A Tree Grows in Brooklyn, Flahooley, Remains to Be Seen, Pal Joey; Billy Budd 1952: Three Wishes for Jamie, Of Thee I Sing, Shuffle Along 1953: Wonderful Town, Maggie, Tea and Sympathy, The Teahouse of the August Moon, Sabrina Fair, The Caine Mutiny Court-Martial 1954: By the Beautiful Sea, The Pajama Game, Hit the Trail, Plain and Fancy 1955: The Desperate Hours, Ankles Aweigh, Damn Yankees, No Time for Sergeants, The Vamp (then titled Delilah), Pipe Dream 1956: My Fair Lady, Strip For Action, Shangri-La, Long Day's Journey into Night, Bells Are Ringing, Candide 1957: New Girl in Town, Copper and Brass 1958: A Touch of the Poet, Redhead 1959: The Sound of Music, Fiorello! 1960: From A to Z, Lock Up Your Daughters, Tenderloin, Advise and Consent, Period of Adjustment, The Conquering Hero, Show Girl 1961: The Happiest Girl in the World, Milk and Honey 1962: We Take the Town, No Strings, A Funny Thing Happened on the Way to the Forum 1963: She Loves Me, Barefoot in the Park, One Flew Over the Cuckoo's Nest 1964: High Spirits, Dylan, Fade Out - Fade In, Awf'lly Nice, Royal Flush 1965: Do I Hear a Waltz?, The Roar of the Greasepaint - The Smell of the Crowd, Flora the Red Menace, The Yearling, Wait Until Dark 1966: The Star-Spangled Girl 1967: How Now, Dow Jones 1968: Plaza Suite, I'm Solomon, A Mother's Kisses, Zorba 1969: 1776, Last of the Red Hot Lovers 1970: Georgy, Cry for Us All, Two By Two, The Gingerbread Lady 1971: The Prisoner of Second Avenue 1972: The Sunshine Boys 1974: God's Favorite 1976: Something Old, Something New (the Shubert's last production for more than seven years)
 1995: Jekyll & Hyde 1997: Proposals (the first original play to tryout at the Shubert since the reopening)
 1999: The Civil War 2001: The Adventures of Tom Sawyer''

Notes and references

External links
 Shubert Theatre - Operated by CAPA (Connecticut Association for the Performing Arts)
 CAPA:History of the Shubert Theatre

Theatres in Connecticut
Tourist attractions in New Haven, Connecticut
Concert halls in the United States
Buildings and structures in New Haven, Connecticut
Economy of New Haven, Connecticut